Volga Ulyanovsk may refer to

 Volga Ulyanovsk Bandy Club
 FC Volga Ulyanovsk, association football club